Charles Percy may refer to:

Charles H. Percy (1919–2011), United States Senator and businessman
Charles "Don Carlos" Percy (1704–1794), founder of a wealthy lineage in the southern United States
Charles Percy (MP), British Member of Parliament for Tynemouth, 1918–1922